The Alive Chimpanzee is produced by WowWee Alive, a division of WowWee Ltd. The animatronic Chimpanzee is the first in WowWee Alive's product line. Unlike WowWee's other robots, the Chimpanzee only consists of the head of a chimpanzee. It houses eight motors to mimic the facial expressions of a real chimp. It also contains 9 sensors, including IR sensors in the eyes, touch sensors on the chin, top and rear of the head and sound and vibration sensors in the ear. There is also an Alive Elvis manufactured.

In attempting to make the Chimpanzee as realistic as possible, each strand of hair is rooted individually into the skin of the robot and the skin moves and is colored to match realistic skin tones, including veining. As with other WowWee robots, the Chimpanzee can be operated in different modes; in its case, the modes are Alive, Guard, Program, Demo and Sleep.

A Popular Science article on Halloween decorating describes how one can remove the robot's skin to create a Terminator-like robot face.

Features 
Some of the Chimpanzee's notable features are:
 Mood dependent behavior: responds to stimuli with mood specific animations and sounds
 Infrared vision system: detects movement, tracks objects and reacts to human interaction
 Touch sensors in his chin, head and ears
 Stereo sound sensors detect loud sounds
 Remote control or autonomous interactivity
 Visual and sonic guard mode
 Program mode
 Sleep mode

Four Moods:
 Curious
 Fearful
 Happy
 Angry

Modes of Operation:
 Alive: default mode. Reacts to sensory input, and performs autonomous actions.
 Direct Control: responds to user commands.
 Program: Up to 20 distinct steps (movements and sounds) can be entered in an ordered sequence that will be stored and can be played back at a later time.
 Guard: Uses the vision and sound sensors to detect intruders around it, and reacts in response, either with a random animation or if a program has been entered.
 Demo: runs through 2 or 3 random animations.
 Sleep: the Chimpanzee will power down after a preset amount of time without activity.

See also
AIBO
Humanoid robot
Roboraptor
Roboreptile
Robosapien v2
WowWee

References

External links 

WowWee Alive - WowWee Alive Product site

Robotic animals
Entertainment robots
WowWee
Animatronic robots
Robot heads
Chimpanzees